Muḥammad Ilyās ibn Muḥammad Ismā‘īl Kāndhlawī Dihlawī (1885 – 13 July 1944) was an Indian Islamic scholar who founded the Tablighi Jamaat Islamic revivalist movement, in 1925, in Mewat province.

Early life and education
Muhammad Ilyas was born in 1303 AH (1885/1886) in the village of Kandhla, Muzaffarnagar district, North-West Provinces, British India (in present-day Shamli district, Uttar Pradesh, India). His year of birth can be computed by the tarikhi (chronogrammatic) name "Akhtar Ilyas" using abjad numerals.

In a local maktab (school), he memorized one and a quarter ajza' of the Qur'an, and he completed memorizing the Qur'an under his father's supervision in Nizamuddin area, Delhi. Thereafter, he studied the elementary books of Arabic and Persian language mostly under his father. Later on, he lived with and studied under Rashid Ahmad Gangohi. In 1905, Rashid Ahmad Gangohi died, when Muhammad Ilyas was 20. In 1908,  Muhammad Ilyas enrolled in Darul Uloom Deoband. He also studied under Mahmud Hasan Deobandi.

Foundation of Tablighi Jamaat
In the early 1920s, he prepared a team of young madrasah graduates from Deoband and Saharanpur and sent them to Mewat to establish a network of mosques and Islamic schools movement. He once said that if he had to attribute a name to his movement, it would have been Tehreek-e-Imaan ('Imaan/Faith movement').  The people of South Asia started calling the devotees Tableeghi and this name eventually became popular among the common people.  The Tablighi Jamaat has since gone on to become one of the most widespread grassroots Islamic movements in the world with a presence in many countries, including Canada, South Africa and the UK.

Legacy 
Abul Hasan Ali Hasani Nadwi wrote a biography named Life and mission of Maulana Mohammad Ilyas.

References

Further reading

1885 births
1944 deaths
Deobandis
Indian Sunni Muslim scholars of Islam
Tablighi Jamaat people
Students of Mahmud Hasan Deobandi
People from Shamli district
Emirs of Tablighi Jamaat